Arthur Pierce may refer to:

 Arthur C. Pierce (1923–1987), American screenwriter and director
 Arthur J. Pierce, head football coach for the Middlebury College Panthers football team, 1909